Angel Chervenkov (born 10 June 1964) is a Bulgarian former footballer and football manager.

Career

As a player
As a footballer, Chervenkov played as a defender for Tundzha Yambol (1980–1981), Armeets Sofia (1981–1984), CSKA Sofia (1984–1987), Lokomotiv Gorna Oryahovitsa (1987–1989), Etar Veliko Tarnovo (1989–1994) and Montana (1994–1996). In Bulgaria's top division, the A PFG, Chervenkov had 298 matches and 40 goals. He won the championship twice, in 1987 with CSKA and in 1991 with Etar, once finished second (with CSKA in 1985) and once third (with Etar in 1990). With CSKA, Chervenkov has two Bulgarian Cup trophies (1985 and 1987) and two Cup of the Soviet Army trophies (1985 and 1986). In the European tournaments, he has featured in 6 matches, scoring once (in one of his two matches for Etar, the rest being for CSKA). Internationally, Chervenkov has 5 caps for the Bulgaria national team. He participated in European Championship 1991/92.

As a manager
Chervenkov started his coaching career in CSKA's youth academy being there from 1999 to 2001. Then he worked as assistant manager at Cherno More Varna in 2002. Year later he return in CSKA Sofia First team as assistant manager (2003 - 2007 ) and won Bulgarian Title (2005) Bulgarian cup (2006) and Bulgarian Supercup (2007). In 2007, he took in charge FBK Kaunas and won Lithuanian Supercup. 
Later that year he became manager of Heart of Midlothian F.C. In 2010, he won the Bulgarian A Group with Litex Lovech.

He managed in Ukraine FC Sevastopol twice (2011, 2014 ), Arsenal Kyiv (2015) and Slovakia FC Tatran Presov (2012), and on 8 June 2016 returned to Bulgarian football becoming a manager of Lokomotiv Gorna Oryahovitsa who had been promoted to the new top level division in Bulgaria - Parva Liga. In 2018 he was invited to manage Chornomorets Odesa.

Honours

Manager honours
Litex Lovech
 Bulgarian A PFG: 2009–10
FBK Kaunas
 Lithuanian Super Cup: 2007
PFC CSKA Sofia
 Bulgarian Supercup 2007
 Bulgarian Cup 2006
 Bulgarian A PFG: 2004–05

References

1964 births
Living people
Bulgarian footballers
Bulgarian football managers
Bulgarian expatriate football managers
FC Lokomotiv Gorna Oryahovitsa players
FC Etar Veliko Tarnovo players
PFC CSKA Sofia players
FC Montana players
First Professional Football League (Bulgaria) players
Heart of Midlothian F.C. managers
PFC Litex Lovech managers
FC Sevastopol managers
1. FC Tatran Prešov managers
Expatriate football managers in Ukraine
Bulgarian expatriate sportspeople in Ukraine
Ukrainian Premier League managers
FC Arsenal Kyiv managers
FC Chornomorets Odesa managers
Association football defenders
People from Yambol Province